Hamilton was an electoral district of the Legislative Assembly in the Australian state of New South Wales created in 1927 with the abolition of proportional representation from part of the 5 member  district of Newcastle and named after the Newcastle suburb of Hamilton. It was abolished in 1971 and replaced by Charlestown.

Members for Hamilton

Election results

References

Former electoral districts of New South Wales
Constituencies established in 1927
Constituencies disestablished in 1971
1927 establishments in Australia
1971 disestablishments in Australia